Erik Murphy (born October 26, 1990) is a French-born Finnish-American professional basketball player for the Fukushima Firebonds of the Japanese B.League. Drafted by the Chicago Bulls in 2013, he also represents the Finnish national team.

High school career
Murphy played high school basketball at St. Mark's School in Southborough, Massachusetts.

Considered a four-star recruit by Rivals.com, Murphy was listed as the No. 22 power forward and the No. 79 player in the nation in 2009.

College career
Murphy accepted an athletic scholarship to attend the University of Florida in Gainesville, Florida, where he played for coach Billy Donovan's Florida Gators men's basketball team from 2009 to 2013.

Murphy became the 49th Florida Gator to record 1,000 points in his collegiate career and was the only Gator to receive first-team all-conference accolades in 2013. He proceeded to become a regular in the starting lineup in his junior year, and was named to the All-SEC Tournament team in 2012 and 2013.

Professional career
Murphy was selected with the 49th overall pick by the Chicago Bulls in the 2013 NBA draft. On July 10, 2013, he signed his rookie scale contract with the Bulls. On November 6, 2013, Murphy made his NBA debut for the Bulls, playing one minute and not recording any stats.  He scored a career-high 2 points on three occasions: December 10, 2013 vs. Milwaukee, December 28, 2013 vs. Dallas, and March 13, 2014 vs. Houston.  On April 3, 2014, he was waived by the Bulls. On April 5, 2014, he was claimed off waivers by the Utah Jazz.

On July 22, 2014, Murphy was traded, along with John Lucas III and Malcolm Thomas, to the Cleveland Cavaliers in exchange for Carrick Felix, a 2015 second round draft pick and cash considerations. On September 25, 2014, he was traded, along with John Lucas III, Dwight Powell, Malcolm Thomas and the Cavaliers' 2016 and 2017 second-round picks, to the Boston Celtics in exchange for Keith Bogans and two future second-round picks. On October 27, 2014, he was waived by the Celtics.

On November 1, 2014, Murphy was selected by the Austin Spurs with the third overall pick in the 2014 NBA D-League draft.

On July 4, 2015, Murphy signed with Beşiktaş of the Turkish Basketball Super League for the 2015–16 season. In late December 2015, he left Beşiktaş. On January 4, 2016, he signed with Demir İnşaat Büyükçekmece for the rest of the season.

On June 26, 2016, Murphy signed with Strasbourg IG of the LNB Pro A for the 2016–17 season.< He will join Finnish national coach Henrik Dettman who reached an agreement with the Strasbourg IG earlier.

On July 28, 2017, Murphy signed with Nanterre 92 for the 2017–18 season.

On February 11, 2018, Murphy signed with New Basket Brindisi of the Italian LBA, but didn't play for them. On March 17, he signed with the Oklahoma City Blue of the NBA G League. He signed a three month deal, with an option for the remainder of the season, with the Skyliners Frankfurt of the German Basketball Bundesliga on August 28, 2018.

On January 28, 2019 he has signed with Baxi Manresa of the Spanish Liga ACB.

National team career

Murphy made his debut for the Finnish national team in August 2014 in a friendly match against Lithuania. He recorded nine points and five rebounds in his debut appearance. He later played in the 2014 FIBA Basketball World Cup where Finland's campaign was ended at the group stages; Murphy averaged 6.8 points over five games. He represented Finland again at EuroBasket 2015, helping his team advance out of the group stage.

NBA career statistics

Regular season

|-
| style="text-align:left;"| 
| style="text-align:left;"| Chicago
| 24 || 0 || 2.6 || .231 || .000 || .000 || .3 || .1 || .0 || .2 || .3
|-
| style="text-align:left;"| Career
| style="text-align:left;"| 
| 24 || 0 || 2.6 || .231 || .000 || .000 || .3 || .1 || .0 || .2 || .3

Personal life
Murphy's father, Jay Murphy, is a former NBA player while his mother, Päivi, played for the Finland women's national basketball team from 1988–1994. His younger brother Alex Murphy also played at Florida. The Murphys are Catholic and members of Saint Francis of Assisi Parish in Wakefield, Rhode Island. 

He holds both American and Finnish passports.

References

External links

Florida Gators bio
ESPN.com bio
Finnish national team statistics 

1990 births
Living people
2014 FIBA Basketball World Cup players
American expatriate basketball people in France
American expatriate basketball people in Germany
American expatriate basketball people in Spain
American expatriate basketball people in Turkey
American men's basketball players
American people of Finnish descent
Austin Spurs players
Basketball players from Massachusetts
Bàsquet Manresa players
Beşiktaş men's basketball players
Büyükçekmece Basketbol players
Chicago Bulls draft picks
Chicago Bulls players
Finnish expatriate basketball people in France
Finnish expatriate basketball people in Turkey
Finnish expatriate basketball people in Spain
Finnish men's basketball players
Finnish people of American descent
Florida Gators men's basketball players
Fukushima Firebonds players
Lega Basket Serie A players
Nanterre 92 players
New Basket Brindisi players
Oklahoma City Blue players
Parade High School All-Americans (boys' basketball)
People from Southborough, Massachusetts
Power forwards (basketball)
SIG Basket players
Skyliners Frankfurt players
Sportspeople from Lyon
Sportspeople from Worcester County, Massachusetts